Reissantia is a genus of flowering plants belonging to the family Celastraceae.

Its native range is Tropical and Subtropical Old World. This includes parts of Africa (Angola, Benin, Botswana, Cameroon, Caprivi Strip, Central African Republic, Congo, Ethiopia, Gabon, Ghana, Guinea, Guinea-Bissau, Gulf of Guinea Islands, Ivory Coast, Liberia, Madagascar, Malawi, Mali, Mozambique, Namibia, Nigeria, Northern Provinces (in South Africa), Senegal, Sierra Leone, Sudan, Tanzania, Uganda, Zambia, Zaïre and Zimbabwe), and parts of Asia (Andaman Islands, Assam, Bangladesh, Borneo, Cambodia, China (south-central and south-east), East Himalaya, Hainan, India, Java, Laos, Lesser Sunda Islands, Malaya, Maluku, Myanmar, Nepal, New Guinea, Philippines, Sri Lanka, Sulawesi, Sumatera, Thailand and Vietnam). 

The genus name of Reissantia is in honour of Charles Tisserant (1886–1962), a French clergyman, botanist and plant collector. 
It was first described and published in Bull. Mus. Natl. Hist. Nat., séries 2, Vol.39 on page 466 in 1958.

Known species
According to Kew:

References

Celastraceae
Celastrales genera
Plants described in 1958
Flora of West Tropical Africa
Flora of West-Central Tropical Africa
Flora of Sudan
Flora of East Tropical Africa
Flora of South Tropical Africa
Flora of the Northern Provinces
Flora of South-Central China
Flora of Southeast China
Flora of the Indian subcontinent
Flora of Indo-China
Flora of Malesia
Flora of New Guinea